Morlaàs (Gascon Morlans) is a commune in the Pyrénées-Atlantiques department in south-western France.

It is the seat of a canton.

After the Roman city of Benearnum (today's Lescar) was razed by the Vikings in 841, Morlaàs became the capital of the ancient province of Béarn. It remained the capital until the 12th century, when Orthez took over.

Population

See also
Communes of the Pyrénées-Atlantiques department

References

Communes of Pyrénées-Atlantiques
Pyrénées-Atlantiques communes articles needing translation from French Wikipedia